Alda Mirta Lazo Ríos de Hornung (born 17 June 1949) is a Peruvian politician and a former  Congresswoman, elected in the 2006 elections, representing Lima for the 2006–2011 term. Lazo belongs to the National Restoration Party. Lazo lost her seat in the 2011 elections when she ran for re-election under the National Solidarity Alliance.

External links

Official Congressional Site

Living people
1949 births
National Restoration (Peru) politicians
National Solidarity Party (Peru) politicians
Members of the Congress of the Republic of Peru
Women members of the Congress of the Republic of Peru